Delfín Benítez Cáceres (24 September 1910 – 8 January 2004) was a Paraguayan football striker.

Benítez started his career in Libertad of his native country. As one of the key players of the Paraguay national football team in the early 1930s, he gained the attention of Argentinian club Boca Juniors and signed with them in 1932. He soon became one of the key players in the team and during the seven years he spent at the club he scored 107 goals in 162 matches, making him the fifth all-time top scorer in Boca Juniors' history . Boca fans consider Benítez as "perhaps the best foreign player to ever wear the blue and gold jersey of Boca Juniors" .

Near the end of his football career, Benítez also played for Argentinian sides Racing Club (1939–41) and Ferro Carril Oeste (1941–44). During his time at Racing he became the top scorer in the Primera División Argentina and in South American football for 1940 with 33 goals, tied with Isidro Lángara of San Lorenzo.

He earned 15 caps for Paraguay, including his participation at the 1929 South American Championship and both of the team's matches at the 1930 World Cup against the United States and Belgium; he scored three goals for Paraguay. Later, he appeared once for the Argentina national football team in 1934, scoring one goal.

After retiring from football as a player, he became a coach and led Independiente Medellín to a Colombian national championship in 1955. He also managed Sporting de Barranquilla, Boca Juniors de Cali and Millonarios. He also coached several Venezuelan football teams.
He is the father of the footballer Delfín Edmundo Benítez.

References

External links

Stats in Boca Juniors
Boca tribute bio

1910 births
1930 FIFA World Cup players
2004 deaths
Sportspeople from Asunción
Paraguayan footballers
Argentine footballers
Argentina international footballers
Paraguay international footballers
Club Libertad footballers
Boca Juniors footballers
Racing Club de Avellaneda footballers
Ferro Carril Oeste footballers
Paraguayan Primera División players
Argentine Primera División players
Expatriate footballers in Argentina
Expatriate footballers in Colombia
Association football forwards
Paraguayan football managers
Dual internationalists (football)
Independiente Medellín managers
Millonarios F.C. managers
Expatriate football managers in Colombia
Expatriate football managers in Venezuela
Paraguayan expatriate sportspeople in Argentina
Paraguayan expatriates in Colombia
Paraguayan expatriate sportspeople in Venezuela